Results from the 1950 Buenos Aires Grand Prix (also called IV Gran Premio Extraordinario Maria Eva Duarte de Perón) held at the Palermo Street Circuit in Buenos Aires on 8 January 1950.

Classification

References

External links
 Palermo Circuit (1948-1950) on Google Maps (Historic Formula 1 Tracks)

Buenos Aires Grand Prix
Buenos Aires Grand Prix
Buenos Aires Grand Prix